

The Reserve Officer School (RUK), located in Hamina, Finland, near the southeastern border, is responsible for the training of most Finnish reserve officers.

Organisation
The school organises two yearly courses of some 700 men and women. The School is organized into a five companies of reserve officer students and two supporting companies. The Reserve Officer course is organised at five companies:
Kärki Company : infantry platoon leader and artillery forward observers
Reconnaissance Company: reconnaissance platoon and squad leaders, and artillery forward observers
Artillery Battery: mortar platoon leaders, battery officers for artillery, artillery reconnaissance officers, various officer duties in anti-aircraft artillery and Naval and Air Force command centres
Engineer Company: combat engineer platoon leaders, EOD detachment leaders, anti-CBRN platoon leaders and anti-tank missile platoon leaders 
Signals and Headquarters Company: signals officers for various duties, logistics officers and military police officers.

In addition to the five companies of the Reserve Officer Course, the School has two companies consisting of ordinary conscripts:
Jäger Company, training military police companies and medics for FDF reserve. The company also organizes the NCO course for the conscripts of the Army Academy on military police and transportation fields.
Transportation Company, training drivers for FDF reserve.

Organizationally, Reserve Officer School is a battalion-level unit which belongs to the Army Academy. The unit was founded in 1920 and has operated continually with a single break from 1945 to 1947 when the Finnish officer training was stopped by order of the Allied Control Commission. Since its founding, the school has been situated in Hamina, with the exception of wartime 1939–45, when the school was evacuated to Niinisalo in Kankaanpää. During the years 1942–45, the school operated under the name of Officer School. Since 1920, the School has trained over 174,000 reserve officers for the Finnish Defence Forces.

The Status of Reserve Officer 
Within the Finnish Defence Forces, the vast majority of officers advance through the ranks during their conscription, instead of being commissioned from without for a separate career path.

At the end of the basic training of eight weeks, some conscripts are selected for extra training as reserve NCOs. After the seven-week phase I of the NCO school, usually organised in the brigade the conscript is serving in, some NCO students are selected to become Reserve Officers, who are trained at the Reserve Officer School. Both the Reserve NCOs and Reserve Officers serve for 11.5 months, while the majority of rank-and-file conscripts serve for 5.5 months.

Reserve Officer School trains reserve officers, most of whom do not continue in active service but are demobilised to the reserve at the end of their conscription. Their service obligation as reservists continues until the age of 60. The reserve officers do not have a military standing while in reserve but when called to active service, reserve officers rank with career officers. The activation may take place for voluntary exercises, for obligatory refresher exercises or, in emergencies, for extraordinary service or for mobilisation. Based on their performance during service in the reserve, reserve officers may be promoted to higher ranks. The highest rank for which reserve officers are eligible is major (in Navy, lieutenant commander), and in extremely rare cases, lieutenant colonel (in the Navy, commander. All officer promotions are decided by the President of Finland, both for career and reserve officers.

The training of a reserve officer is also an obligatory prerequisite for attending the National Defence University. Those conscript NCOs who are accepted to the National Defence University, are selected on the condition of passing a platoon-leader course that gives the equivalent training as the Reserve Officer School.

The Training in the Reserve Officer School 
After the first seven weeks of the NCO school, those most suitable for Reserve Officer training are selected on the basis of the first phase of schooling and the basic conscript phase.

In the Reserve Officer School students receive training for the duties of platoon leader (or equivalent). The curriculum includes studies in leadership, tactics and physical education. After a 3½-month-long course, they are promoted to officer cadets and sent to their 'home' garrisons to train their wartime platoons from the recruits. After 5 months of service as officer cadets, they are promoted second lieutenants and discharged. Come war, they would ideally lead more or less the same platoon as they led at training time.

Traditionally, the training of a reserve officer has carried certain social distinction and has been tied to high positions in industry and economy. E.g. former Nokia CEO Jorma Ollila was the Chairman of his Reserve Officer course.

The high educational level of most reserve officers offers the Finnish Defence Forces a chance to fill many wartime vacancies on the basis of civilian professions. For instance, a manager of a civilian transportation company might have a wartime placement as a brigade-level logistics officer. Conscripts who are medical students or doctors are usually given special training to become reserve medical officers.

Other Reserve Officer Training 
Some special branches carry out their own reserve officer training. Among these are the Special and Para Jäger units of Utti Jaeger Regiment and officers for the armoured troops of the Armoured Brigade. Navy reserve officers are trained in Naval Warfare School and Air Force reserve officers in Air Force Academy.

Those reserve NCOs who show, during their service in the reserve, exceptional dedication and suitability for officer duties, may be trained on a separate aliupseerista upseeriksi (NCO to officer) course. Typically, they have a civilian occupation or profession that makes them ideal candidates for a wartime position requiring officer training. The FDF website cites ideal examples of a lawyer who would be trained to serve as a wartime military lawyer or a construction engineer who would serve as a heavy earthmoving equipment platoon leader.

Such courses are organised annually by the Reserve Officer School, together with the National Defence Training Association of Finland. The courses start in October with the reserve officer course of the conscripts who started their service in July and end in July with the reserve officer course of the conscripts who started serving in January. During this time, the reservists participate in 40 days of training and exercises in the Reserve Officer School, in addition to a large amount of distance-education. The reservists who pass the course are promoted second lieutenants on the Finnish Independence Day of the same year.

The Reserve Officer School also organises, in conjunction with the conscript course, the Military Leadership Course, which gives a training corresponding the reserve officer training to those Finnish Defence Forces personnel who have at least NCO training but require a reserve officer training for service as chaplains or specialist officers (e.g. medical officers or engineering officers).

References

Army units and formations of Finland
Military schools
Hamina
Recipients of the Order of the Cross of Liberty
Military officer training
Military education and training in Finland